Ståle Steen Sæthre (born 2 April 1993) is a Norwegian football forward who currently plays for HIFK Fotboll.

He hails from Fusa but moved east in 2009 to attend the Norwegian College of Elite Sport in Bærum and play for Ullern. He soon joined the youth team of Lyn. After Lyn's demise in early 2010 he went to Bærum's youth team, then in mid-2011 Stabæk.

He made his senior league debut for Stabæk as a substitute in the loss against Aalesunds FK in July 2012, and almost immediately got a yellow card. After just a few matches he signed for Asker.

In 2013, he played fairly regularly for Asker, also scoring a goal as Asker eliminated incumbent top league runners-up Strømsgodset from the 2013 Norwegian Football Cup. In the summer however he returned to his hometown Bergen and FK Fyllingsdalen.

After some time in Bergen, he played for Førde IL in 2015, returning to Hordaland and Lysekloster IL in the summer that year. After a trial with Icelandic ÍBV in the winter of 2017, he started the 2017 season for Nest-Sotra. In the 2018 summer window he signed for Aalesund.

Career statistics

Club

References

1993 births
Living people
People from Fusa
Norwegian footballers
Stabæk Fotball players
Asker Fotball players
Eliteserien players
Association football forwards
Sportspeople from Vestland